In Honor: A Compilation to Beat Cancer is a double-disc Various Artists compilation album released by Vagrant Records on September 21, 2004. The release was first announced on June 24, 2004, and was promoted as a benefit album for cancer treatment organizations the Syrentha Savio Endowment and the Sean McGrath Fund. The release features a great deal of previously unreleased material.

Track listing

References

External links
 Vagrant Records page for ''In Honor: A Compilation to Beat Cancer

2004 compilation albums
Charity albums
Vagrant Records compilation albums
Alternative rock compilation albums
Punk rock compilation albums